Maharajpur may refer to:

 Maharajpur, Madhya Pradesh, a town in Madhya Pradesh, India
 Maharajpur (Madhya Pradesh Vidhan Sabha constituency), the assembly constituency encompassing the town
 Maharajpur, Kanpur, a town in Uttar Pradesh, India
 Maharajpur (Uttar Pradesh Assembly constituency), the assembly constituency encompassing the town
 Maharajpur, Unnao, a village in Uttar Pradesh, India
 Maharajpur railway station, in Jharkhand, India